An ecclesiastical full moon is formally the 14th day of the ecclesiastical lunar month (an ecclesiastical moon) in an ecclesiastical lunar calendar.  The ecclesiastical lunar calendar spans the year with lunar months of 30 and 29 days which are intended to approximate the observed phases of the Moon.   Since a true synodic month has a length that can vary from about 29.27 to 29.83 days,  the moment of astronomical opposition tends to be roughly 14.75 days after the previous conjunction of the Sun and Moon (the new moon).  The ecclesiastical full moons of the Gregorian lunar calendar tend to agree with the dates of astronomical opposition, referred to a day beginning at midnight at 0 degrees longitude, to within a day or so.  However, the astronomical opposition happens at a single moment for the entire Earth:  The hour and day at which the opposition is measured as having taken place will vary with longitude.   In the ecclesiastical calendar, the 14th day of the lunar month, reckoned in local time, is considered the day of the full moon at each longitude.

Schematic lunar calendars can and do get out of step with the Moon. A useful way of checking their performance is to compare the variation of the astronomical new moon with a standard time of 6 a.m. on the last day of a 30-day month and 6 p.m. (end of day) on the last day of a 29-day month.
 
Beginning in the medieval period the age of the ecclesiastical moon was announced daily in the office of Prime at the reading of the martyrology. This is still done today by those using the extraordinary form of the Roman Rite adhering to the 1962 Roman Breviary.  

In the Book of Common Prayer of the Protestant Episcopal Church of the United States of America, the dates of the paschal full moons for the 19 years of the Gregorian Easter cycle are indicated by the placement of the Golden Number to the left of the date in March or April on which the paschal full moon falls in that year of the cycle.  The same practice is followed in some editions of the Book of Common Prayer of the Church of England.

Paschal full moon

The paschal full moon is the ecclesiastical full moon of the northern spring and is used in the determination of the date of Easter.  The name "paschal" is derived from "Pascha", a transliteration of the Aramaic word meaning Passover.  The date of Easter is determined as the first Sunday after the  "paschal full moon" that falls on or after March 21. (March 21 is the ecclesiastical equinox, the date fixed by the Gregorian reform of the calendar as a fixed reference date for the Spring Equinox in the Northern hemisphere; the actual Equinox can fall on March 19, 20 or 21).  This "full moon" does not currently correspond directly to any astronomical event, but is instead the 14th day of a lunar month, determined from tables. It may differ from the date of the actual full moon by up to two days.

The calculations to determine the date of the paschal full moon can be described as follows:

 Nineteen civil calendar years are divided into 235 lunar months of 30 and 29 days each.
 This period of 19 years (the metonic cycle) is used because it produces a set of civil calendar dates for the ecclesiastical moons that repeats every nineteen years while still providing a reasonable approximation to the astronomical facts.
 The first day of each of these lunar months is the ecclesiastical new moon.  Exactly one ecclesiastical new moon in each year falls on a date between March 8 and April 5, both inclusive.  This begins the paschal lunar month for that year, and thirteen days later (that is, between March 21 and April 18, both inclusive) is the paschal full moon.
 Easter is the Sunday following the paschal full moon.

In other words, Easter falls from one to seven days after the paschal full moon, so that if the paschal full moon is on Sunday, Easter is the following Sunday. Thus the earliest possible date of Easter is March 22, while the latest possible date is April 25.

Earliest Easter 

In 1818, as a paschal full moon fell on Saturday March 21 (the ecclesiastical fixed date for the Equinox), Easter was the following day—Sunday March 22—the earliest date possible. It will not fall on this date again until 2285, a span of 467 years.

Latest Easter 

In 1943 a full moon fell on Saturday March 20. As this was before March 21, the next full moon, which fell on Sunday April 18, determined the date of Easter—the following Sunday, April 25. It will not fall on this date again until 2038, a span of 95 years.

For a detailed discussion of the paschal computations, see Date of Easter (the Computus).

Easter tables 
By the middle of the third century AD computists of some churches, among which were the Church of Rome and the one of Alexandria, had begun to calculate their own periodic sequences of dates of paschal full moon, to be able to determine their own dates of Easter Sunday.   The motivation for these experiments was a dissatisfaction with the Jewish calendars that Christians had hitherto relied on to fix the date of Easter.  These Jewish calendars, according to their Christian critics, sometimes placed Nisan 14, the paschal full moon and the day of preparation for the Jewish Passover, before the spring equinox (see Easter). The Christians who began the experiments with independent computations held that the paschal full moon should never precede the equinox.

The computational principles developed at Alexandria eventually became normative, but their reception was a centuries-long process during which Alexandrian Easter tables competed with other tables incorporating different arithmetical parameters.  So for a period of several centuries the sequences of dates of the paschal full moon applied by different churches could show great differences (see Easter controversy).

See also
 Computus
 Dionysius Exiguus' Easter table
 Golden numbers
 Reform of the date of Easter

References

Calendars
Catholic liturgy
Christian terminology
Easter date
Eastern Christian liturgy
Full moon